The 1996 Grand Prix de Suisse was the 81st edition of the Züri-Metzgete road cycling one day race. It was held on 25 August 1996 as part of the 1996 UCI Road World Cup. The race took place between the cities of Basel and Zürich was won by Andrea Ferrigato of Italy.

Result

References 

Züri-Metzgete
Züri-Metzgete
Züri-Metzgete